Chuteira Preta is a Brazilian drama television series written and directed by Paulo Nascimento. The first season consists of 13 episodes and premiered on Prime Box Brazil on July 13, 2019.

Premise
Exposing the association football underworld that causes career decline and financial losses. The series follows the story of the soccer player Kadu (Márcio Kieling). After a successful career in teams from Portugal and Spain, the athlete has a disastrous return to Brazilian football. He decides to return to his roots in periphery soccer, when he was not a professional and used to play soccer barefoot.

Cast
 Márcio Kieling	as	 Kadu
 Nuno Leal Maia	as	 Jair
 Jussara Brozoza	as	 Nice
 Allan Souza Lima	as	 Carniça
 Karin Roepke	as	 Flávia
 Nicola Siri	as	 Genaro
 José Victor Castiel	as	 Dr. Sangaletti
 Gabrielle Fleck	as	 Carol
 Edna Lima	as	 Patty
 Kadu Moliterno	as	 Cedenir
 Vaneza Oliveira	as	 Gisa
 Maria Zilda Bethlem as Dolores Castanho
 Ingra Lyberato as Carmen

Production

Filming
The series was filmed for seven weeks, between March and April 2018, around the Metropolitan area of Porto Alegre. In total, there were 130 sets and 50 different locations, including the Estádio Beira-Rio, periphery soccer fields, villages and the Port of Porto Alegre.

References

External links

2019 Brazilian television series debuts
2010s Brazilian television series
Brazilian drama television series
Portuguese-language television shows
Fictional association football television series